Rune Erland (born 25 August 1968) is a Norwegian handball player. He played 129 matches and scored 474 goals for the Norway men's national handball team between 1987 and 1997.  He participated at the 1993 World Men's Handball Championship.

With his club Viking HK, Erland was national champion in 1988 and 1994. Playing for VfL Gummersbach, he was part of winning the Handball-Bundesliga in 1991.

References

1968 births
Living people
Norwegian male handball players
Expatriate handball players
Norwegian expatriate sportspeople in Germany